Vladislav Nikolayevich Radimov (born 26 November 1975) is a Russian football coach and a former player who played midfielder. He was previously the captain of FC Zenit Saint Petersburg and is a former Russian international player. He was a right-sided midfielder or playmaker. At Zenit Saint Petersburg he often played a free playing holding midfielder (like a deep lying playmaker) or a central midfielder.

Playing career
As a child, Radimov attended fencing school, but at the age of 9 left it for the Smena football school. He did not receive much attention from the Saint Petersburg clubs, and in 1992 he appeared in only one match for the Second Division team Smena-Saturn. In June 1992 he moved to Moscow to play for the reserve team of CSKA Moscow. Radimov debuted for the first team of CSKA on 30 July 1992 when a number of players did not fly to an away match against Okean Nakhodka.

In 1994 Radimov became a first-team regular for CSKA, and was first capped for the national team in a friendly against Austria. In 1994, he was named the best new player of the league by Football Review, and in 1995 he received the Strelets prize as "the hope of the season".

In 1996 Radimov played in all three Russia's matches at Euro 96, and transferred to Real Zaragoza after the finals. He spent two and a half seasons there. By the end of 1998 Radimov had a little playing time at Zaragoza and was loaned to Dynamo Moscow. Contrary to the expectations, his 1999 season in Russia was not successful. After the end of loan he returned to Zaragoza. In 2000, he transferred to Levski Sofia, but had a little playing time with them and was eventually released from the team, following a disciplinary breach.

In 2001, Radimov returned to Russia again to play for Krylia Sovetov Samara. He became the captain of the team soon. After two years in Samara, he moved to his home city to play for Zenit Saint Petersburg. He was elected the team captain immediately.

Personal life
On 18 October 2005, Radimov married popular singer Tatiana Bulanova.

Career statistics

Honours
CSKA Moscow
Russian Cup: runner-up 1993–94

Dynamo Moscow
Russian Cup: runner-up 1998–99

Zaragoza
Copa del Rey: 2000–01

Levski Sofia
Bulgarian A Professional Football Group: 2000–01

Zenit Saint Petersburg
Russian Premier League: 2007; runner-up 2003
Russian Premier League Cup: 2003
Russian Super Cup: 2008
UEFA Cup: 2007–08
UEFA Super Cup: 2008

References

 Russia – Record International Players, rsssf.com
 Profile at Zenit 
 Website from LEVSKI2000 
 Biography at Krylia Sovetov

External links
 Radimov's official website 

1975 births
Living people
Russian footballers
Footballers from Saint Petersburg
Association football midfielders
Russia international footballers
Russia under-21 international footballers
Russia youth international footballers
UEFA Cup winning players
UEFA Euro 1996 players
UEFA Euro 2004 players
Russian Premier League players
La Liga players
First Professional Football League (Bulgaria) players
PFC CSKA Moscow players
Real Zaragoza players
FC Dynamo Moscow players
PFC Levski Sofia players
PFC Krylia Sovetov Samara players
FC Zenit Saint Petersburg players
Russian expatriate footballers
Russian expatriate sportspeople in Spain
Expatriate footballers in Spain
Russian expatriate sportspeople in Bulgaria
Expatriate footballers in Bulgaria